Lou Deprijck (born 1946 in Lessines, Wallonia) is a Belgian singer and record producer. He was a major figure in the Belgian pop scene of the 1970s and 1980s, with more than 20 million copies of his compositions sold worldwide. He is best known for having co-written with Yves Lacomblez, and for having de facto sung, the Plastic Bertrand 1978 song "Ça plane pour moi".

Music career

Early work and Two Man Sound 
His first group Pop' Liberty 6 had a complete flop in 1967 with "Je Suis Pop Et Tout À Fait Dingue". However he later found success with Two Man Sound, a Latin-pop outfit formed with Sylvain Vanholme of the Wallace Collection and Yvan Lacomblez. Two Man Sound sold over a million copies of their 1975 single "Charlie Brown" while the album Disco Samba, with the eponymous song, had sales of around 1.4 million copies in Latin America.

Deprijck also had a major 1978 solo success in France and Belgium with ska/reggae song "Kingston, Kingston", under the moniker Lou & The Hollywood Bananas.

Plastic Bertrand and Viktor Lazlo 
In the English-speaking world, Deprijck's best known hit was "Ça plane pour moi", which he recorded and sang for Plastic Bertrand, who remains generally credited for the song (and was upheld legally in 2006 as being entitled to be called its artist).  In fact, Deprijck was also the "voice" of Plastic Bertrand's first four albums.  In 2006, a Belgian appeal court ruled that Bertrand was the "legal performer" of the classic track, but the ruling was overturned in 2010.

In the 1980s, Deprijck was also the creative force behind the success of Viktor Lazlo, born Sonia Dronier, whom he met at Le Mirano nightclub in Brussels. She initially did backing vocals for Lou & the Hollywood Bananas before taking the name Viktor Lazlo from a character in the 1942 film Casablanca at Deprijck's suggestion. He produced the self-titled album Viktor Lazlo in 1987 for her, as well as the album Hot & Soul in 1989.

In 1984, calling himself Lou Van Houten, Deprijck released the album Collures with Boris Bergman under the pseudonym Les Epatants.

Present life in Thailand 
Deprijck currently resides largely near Pattaya, Thailand. The story of his life in Thailand was shown in the VTM TV channel documentary Vlamingen in Pattaya (Flemings in Pattaya) as part of the Belgian news program Telefacts. Life in Pattaya inspired him to rewrite the text of his most famous song "Kingston, Kingston" into "Pattaya, Pattaya", which soon became the unofficial hymn of Pattaya.

See also
 List of best-selling Belgian artists

References

External links 
 Discogs, Lou Deprijck
 Two Man Sound
 Lou & The Hollywood Bananas
 

Belgian male singers
Belgian record producers
Living people
1946 births
People from Lessines